Bengala may refer to:

 Bengala (wrestler), the name of several Mexican professional wrestlers
 Bengala River, in Rio de Janeiro state, Brazil
 Bengala, a 2018 album by Lorenzo Fragola
 Jim Bengala, captain of the 1970 Miami Redskins football team

See also
 
 Bengal (disambiguation)
 Bengalai, a town in Pakistan
 Porto Grande de Bengala, the Portuguese settlement in Chittagong
 Megarasbora elanga, a fish commonly called Bengala barb